The characters from the anime series Digimon Fusion are, for a time, divided as separate groups; as the series progresses, the factions eventually come together as the final stages of the battle for the Digital World approach.

Fusion Fighters
The Fusion Fighters, called  in the Japanese version, work to bring peace for the Digital World, by protecting inhabitants. They are led by Mikey Kudo. During the series, he recruits Nene Amano and Christopher Aonuma. In the Dark Generals Arc, they form the Fusion Fighters United Army (クロスハート連合軍 Kurosu Hāto Rengougun?, lit. "Xros Heart United Army") 
<ref>Only named in the [http://www.toei-anim.co.jp/tv/digimon_xw2010/character.html characters section for Digimon Xros Wars: The Evil Death Generals and the Seven Kingdomss official website].</ref>

He excels in all sports and has a charming personality that wins over humans and Digimon alike, though he has a tendency to overexert himself. Receiving his red Fusion Loader from Omnimon, one of the Legendary Digimon, Mikey founded the Fusion Fighters alongside his partner Shoutmon. Aside from his charisma, Mikey has proven himself to be an excellent strategist, able to see through the plans of his enemies and counter them accordingly, making his presence a necessity for the team. Unlike other members, Mikey can hear the melody of Digimon that are in life-threatening danger. During their travels, they meet many friendly Digimon who join their cause. They encounter the rival group Blue Flare. They face the evil minions of the Bagra Army as well as Team Midnight. They allow Midnight's former general Nene, Sparrowmon, Monimon and the Monitamons, to join their group after SkullKnightmon casts her aside once she outlives her usefulness to him.

When Bagramon steals all 108 Code Crown fragments, he sends Mikey, Angie, Jeremy and Shoutmon back to Earth. There, Mikey learns that time on Earth is far slower than in the Digital World before he attempts to find a way back to the Digital World to save it. By then, the one who gave him his Fusion Loader is revealed to be Omnimon, who reveals the origin of the DigiCards as well as the history of the Digital World and tells them how he ended up on Earth as a DigiCard and has been searching for someone who could hear him, which turns out to be Mikey, as only he can hear the Digital Melody. After enabling Shoutmon to digivolve into OmniShoutmon, in order to do battle, defeat and ultimately destroy Tactimon, Mikey returns to the Digital World with Shoutmon. Upon returning to the Digital World, Mikey and Shoutmon learn that Bagramon had it reconstructed into a realm composed of the Bagra Fortress and seven kingdoms, each ruled by a Dark General with their very own Darkness Loader. Reunited with the other Fusion Fighters, Mikey and Nene convince Christopher to join forces with them and they set to travel together through the Kingdoms to challenge the Dark Generals and liberate the Digital World from Bagramon. Although at the age of 13, he must protect the Digital World at all costs. After defeating MegaDarknessBagramon, the Digimon members of the Fusion Fighters United Army return to the Digital World. One year later, Mikey, now in eighth grade, formed a street basketball team "Xros Heart" with Ewan and Tagiru. When the DigiQuartz appears connecting the Real World, Mikey solves the mystery of the attacks. He is revealed to be one of the six Legendary Heroes of the Digimon Multiverse.

Shoutmon

 is a ferocious dragon Digimon with extremely high aggressiveness due to hot-blooded enthusiasm, yet friendly towards his comrades. He enjoys singing and wields a microphone for leisure and to help in combat, his chances of winning depending on the amount of passion he has. When wounded while protecting the Village of Light from the Bagra Army's invasion of the Forest Zone, Shoutmon met Mikey as the two eventually join forces to save his home from the invaders. Becoming Mikey's main Digimon partner, Shoutmon's goal is to become Digimon King in order to better protect others, seeing the Code Crown fragments as a mean to fulfill his selfless desire. He acts as the core component of all the Fusion Fighters' primary DigiFusions and is the only member of the Fusion Fighters able to digivolve by himself naturally as well. He ultimately fused himself with all the Digimon members of both the Fusion Fighters and Blue Flare, the restored Digimon which comprised the DigiCards, ally Digimon met during the course of his journey through the Zones and Lands of the Digital World, former enemies, as well as the remaining Digimon inhabitants of the Digital World to take down DarknessBagramon and save both the Digital World and the Earth. After the battle against MegaDarknessBagramon, Shoutmon works hard to improve the newly reformed Digital World as the new Digimon King, until several Digimon start disappearing into DigiQuartz and he joins forces with Mikey once again looking to find the reason for it.

Shoutmon's DigiFusions have included:
 Shoutmon X2: The DigiFusion of Shoutmon and Ballistamon, a humanoid mechanical Digimon that combines the former's speed and the latter's strength. His signature move's Sonic Tsunami (Buddy Blaster), firing a beam from the horn on his chest. This form is occasionally equipped with the Star Axe. By executing DigiFuse with ChibiTortomon, Shoutmon ×2 becomes the water-capable Shoutmon Times Two Plus M.
 Shoutmon X3: A powerful, human-shaped Digimon that is the DigiFusion of Shoutmon, Ballistamon & Dorulumon. Combining his components' attributes, Shoutmon X3's a flexible fighter with a "V" on his chest as an all-purpose weapon in his V for Victory (Three Victorize) and Varooma-Boomerang (Victorize Boomerang) attacks.
 Shoutmon X4: A form assumed by Shoutmon ✕3 equipped with the Star Sword, able to execute the Great Sword of Victory (Burning Star Crusher) slash attack. Shoutmon ✕4 can DigiFuse with Knightmon and his PawnChessmon to become the knight-like . He can also DigiFuse with Beelzemon to become the centaur-like warrior  , armed with several rifles, performing the Chaos Flare Cannon attack. With Spadamon,  is formed, armed with a lance. In the second season of the anime, Mikey and Ewan can Double Fusion to create Shoutmon X4.
 : Shoutmon ✕4 DigiFused with Sparrowmon, gaining a new helmet, a shield and wings. He can DigiFuse with Beelzemon to become , where he becomes a winged centaur-like warrior armed with several rifles.
 : The Double Fusion between OmniShoutmon and ZekeGreymon, an extremely powerful Digimon armed with the "DX Double Blade" ("Electric Buster Xros" in the original Japanese) bayonets on his left arm and the "Daggerstrike" ("Trident JusFang" in the original Japanese) claws on his right. His signature move is "Brave Beat Rock Double Fusion" ("Brave Beat Rock Double Xros" in the original Japanese), either consuming himself in energy while ramming an opponent or launching two overlapping energy crosses hued in red and blue, the respective colors of the Fusion Fighters and Blue Flare. This DigiFusion is the first in which the component Digimon digivolve into their stronger forms to gain this digivolution fusion; the second digivolution fusion ever known would be the manga-exclusive Shoutmon EX6.
 : It is a DigiFusion of Shoutmon DX, Ballistamon, Dorulumon, and the Star Sword, a form only appears in the manga.
 : The Great Fusion of OmniShoutmon with ZekeGreymon, Ballistamon, Dorulumon, Sparrowmon and the Starmons. A massive Digimon armed with such attacks as "Xros Burning Rocker", "Double Flare Buster", "7 Victorize" & "7 Victorize Maximum". The most powerful Digimon of the Fusion Fighters United Army. In the final battle against DarknessBagramon, using the Final Fusion, he becomes  by DigiFusing all of the members of the Fusion Fighters United Army (Fusion Fighters+ Blue Flare), The DigiCards, as well as all the remaining Digimon from the Digital World and attacking with "Final Xros Blade", destroying the nigh-almighty villain.
 : It is the Evolution Xros of OmniShoutmon, ZekeGreymon, AtlurBallistamon, JagerDorulumon and RaptorSparrowmon. Its body is formed from AtlurBallistamon, with its legs folding up into a tail while its larger tusk folds in, revealing Shoutmon EX6's head. AtlurBallistamon's tiny forearms latch onto the main arms. JagerDorulumon's body becomes the left leg, with its cuisses flipping around to mimic the flame patterns on X7's leg and its shield connecting beneath that to become the left foot. Its lance combines with RaptorSparrowmon's head to become the Demolition Horn. The lower half of RaptorSparrowmon's body becomes EX6's groin, with the legs folding up into thighs, while the upper half becomes the top of the wing assembly. Its tail and pinions fuse into the Soul Calibur, with a small panel folding down on the upper body to cover where the tail detached. It has the OmniShoutmon and ZekeGreymon components in the same places as X7, except that the X7 head stays on the left pauldron. The heads of AtlurBallistamon and JagerDorulumon go in the same places as Ballistamon and Dorulumon's heads did. ZekeGreymon's wings disconnect before attaching to the main wing assembly, allowing it to create an X-shaped wing assembly with all the wings perpendicular to the plane of EX6's stance, unlike with X7 where the wings are in the plane. This form only appears in the manga.
 Other DigiFusions: During the Fusion Fighters' time in the Warrior Zone, Shoutmon DigiFused with other members of the group to become CuteShoutmon with Cutemon,  with Dondokomon,  with Jijimon,   with a PawnChessmon, .with a MonitamonOther 'special' forms : Shoutmon's natural digivolved form, a Dragonoid Digimon with a glowing golden body infused with Omnimon's power. Shoutmon first naturally digivolved while on Earth when Mikey's Fusion Loader absorbs the energy of Jeremy and Angie's emotions. As a result, Shoutmon becomes able to fight on his own with much more power than any of his previous DigiFused forms possessed. From then on, as the Fusion Fighters' strongest individual Digimon, OmniShoutmon became Shoutmon's primary fighting form with Shoutmon's previous DigiFusion forms before the digivolution-based Fusions being used less.

Mikey's other Digimon
The following Digimon are under Mikey:

 
 
 Starmon is a small, star-shaped Digimon with sunglasses, who serves as the Pickmon leader and sees Shoutmon as their boss. Normally forming the hilt of the Star Sword, Rare Star Sword and Star Axe, Starmon can become the gunsight of the Meteor Cannon when DigiFused with Beelzemon and several silver Pickmon. In the English dub, Starmon speaks in the style of Elvis Presley. In the manga, Starmon and Pickmon can DNA Digivolve into .

 
 
 The Pickmonz are a group of small Digimon who view Starmon as their leader. The Pickmon come in three varieties: yellow, silver and red.

 
 
 Dondokomon is a small Digimon shaped like a taikō drum with drum sticks for arms. Living with his kind in the Village of Light, Dondokomon chooses to travel with the Fusion Fighters. Dondokomon later DigiFuses with Cutemon, Jijimon, ChibiTortomon, Persiamon, Knightmon, and the PawnChessmon to form GreatestCutemon.

 
 
 Jijimon is an elderly Digimon who serves as a sage-like figure in the Village of Light. He accompanies the Fusion Fighters and acts as their guide. Jijimon first DigiFuses with ChibiTortomon along with Knightmon, PawnChessmon, Beastmon, Dondokomon and Cutemon to form GreatestCutemon. He later DigiFuses with ChibiTortomon along with Golemon to form Golem Jiji Tortomon.

 
 
 Lilymon is Shoutmon's childhood friend in the Village of Light, helping him in his attempt to convince Mikey in staying. She assists Mikey and Shoutmon when they returned to the Digital World, updating them on what occurred in their absence and rescuing the other Fusion Fighters from the fearsome Dark General Dorbickmon. Lilymon joins up with Mikey following Dorbickmon's destruction. In the manga, Lilymon, alongside a Sunflowmon and three Mushroomon, went with the Fusion Fighters following MachLeomon's destruction.

 
 
 ChibiTortomon is a small turtle Digimon who lived in the Island Zone and admired the Fusion Fighters when they came to his home with a desire to be as strong as them. After some inspiring words from Shoutmon to follow his dream, ChibiTortomon helps the Fusion Fighters against Octomon before joining the group. As a member of the Fusion Fighters, ChibiTortomon serves as an underwater scout and enables Digimon he is Digifused with to breathe and swim freely underwater. He was presented by Wisemon to help Mikey with water support. Even though the English dub refers to him as ChibiTortomon, he is listed as ChibiKamemon in the credits.
  The DigiFusion of Golemon, Jijimon and ChibiTortomon.

 
 
 Beastmon is a catgirl Digimon and the beautiful princess of the Lake Zone, who has a habit of sleeping. Though her role in the Fusion Fighters is small, Beastmon played a role in the formation of GreatestCutemon and took down the enlarged Tyutyumon singlehanded, before eating him due to her feline instincts.

 
 
 Knightmon is a knight Digimon who is loyal to Beastmon. He was saved by Mikey when the Fusion Fighters came to the Lake Zone following his army's fight with IceDevimon. He serves as the leader of the PawnChessmon unit. Other than forming GreatestCutemon, along with his PawnChessmon, Cutemon, ChibiKamemon, Dondokomon, Jijimon, and Beastmon, Knightmon can also DigiFuse with Wisemon to become .

 
 
 Eight PawnChessmon, who are under Knightmon's leadership, also join the Fusion Fighters once they save the Lake Zone. In the Japanese version, they tend to say "Chess" at the end of their sentences. The PawnChessmon later DigiFuse with Cutemon, ChibiKamemon, Dondokomon, Jijimon, Knightmon, and Beastmon, to form GreatestCutemon. The PawnChessmon were also DigiFused with the Gaossmon to form PawnGaossmon.

 
 
 Deputymon is a gunslinger Digimon that the Fusion Fighters met in the Sand Zone. He was looking for a treasure in a diamond mine when he ran into the Fusion Fighters. Deputymon later gave the Sand Zone's Code Crown fragment and four DigiCards to Mikey. When Laylamon forcibly teleported the Fusion Fighters out of the Sand Zone, Deputymon was taken with them, officially making him a part of the team, with the main role of tracker. In his DigiFusions with Beelzemon and Ballistamon, he provides each with additional fire power. In the English dub, Deputymon speaks in a Western accent and his gun parts were recolored to blue.

 
 
 Beelzemon was originally , an elusive rifle-wielding Digimon who lived in the Sand Zone's city of Silica and was raised by the Warriors of Light under the guidance of their leader, Angemon. However, the actions of Laylamon, via Ebemon, led to the sect's downfall and Silica's ruin, with Reapmon joining the Bagra Army to find the one responsible to avenge his friends. In the Japanese dub, Reapmon eventually earns the nickname of the  due to his role as the Bagra Army's most skilled assassin, only ranking below the Three Generals. He occasionally assisted Laylamon during her attacks on the Lake Zone and later in the Sand Zone, where he halts his attack on Mikey when the goddess that his order revered deemed him a warrior for their cause. At the time, Reapmon learns that Laylamon is the mastermind behind his order's downfall, before being injured by her while helping the Fusion Fighters. Though Reapmon refused to have Mikey put his team at risk by healing him, his act of self-sacrifice to protect Shoutmon X4K from HiMachinedramon causes his order's goddess to finally accept him as her warrior and reincarnate him into Beelzemon. In his current state, Beelzemon is a powerful Demon Lord Digimon, armed with a large gun attached to his right arm and the ability to move through Zones on his own. Besides aiding in the formation of Shoutmon X4B and Shoutmon X5B, Beelzemon can also DigiFuse with Starmon and several silver Pickmons to equip himself with the powerful  or with Deputymon to gain an additional gun attached to his left arm and be armed with the Twin Cannons. In the Underworld, Beelzemon sacrifices himself to let the Fusion Fighters United Army return to Bright Land. He is revived in the final battle with DarknessBagramon and reciprocates the love Mervamon feels for him just before the final battle ensues. Shoutmon still teases him about him and Mervamon.

 
 
 A resident of the Dust Zone, Puppetmon's nose grows longer when he lies. Originally a moody and distrusting figure due to the lifestyle in the Dust Zone, Puppetmon desired to leave it and saw a chance when he steals Mikey's Fusion Loader to give to GrandLocomon. However, GrandLocomon goes back on their deal and Puppetmon sides with the Fusion Fighters to get back the Fusion Loader. He was later seen in DigiQuartz, providing blueprints of GigaBreakdramon to the robotics club at Mikey's school, piloting the completed GigaBreakdramon for destructive purposes, until Mikey and Shoutmon were able to snap Puppetmon back to his senses. When DigiFused with Shoutmon, Puppetmon provides Shoutmon with wooden armor and upgrades his microphone into a hammer.

 
 
 A researcher of the Digital World who Mikey encounters upon colliding with his book (which is immune to the effects of the Digital Space) after being separated from the Fusion Fighters by Arukadhimon. Wisemon wanted to research Mikey in various ways. He assists Mikey in saving the rest of the Fusion Fighters from Arukadhimon at the cost of his book. Mikey discovered, upon arrival in the Warrior Zone, that Wisemon had joined up with them. Wisemon serves as the Fusion Fighters' advisor and researcher and possesses telekinetic abilities. Wisemon was later DigiFused with Mervamon and Hi-Vision Monitamon to enable Doumon's defeat in the first fight against Ewan Amano and then with Knightmon to form Knightmon Wise Sword Mode during the final battle with the Bagra Army. In the second season of the anime, Wisemon created a teleportation machine that enables Shoutmon and the other Fusion Fighters to transfer themselves from the Digital World to Mikey's Fusion Loader.

She has proven herself to be strong-willed and courageous, such as when she overcame Laylamon's mind control by slashing her in the face with the Lake Zone's Code Crown fragment. Angie lives with her family, taking care of her three younger siblings. She stated to play shooting games with one of them, which helped in the Island Zone sub-arc. At one point, she and Mikey became close friends. She acts as the Fusion Fighters' peacemaker, often cheering on the backup members of the team in battle and forming a special bond with Cutemon. At the beginning of the series, Angie arrives at the Digital World. She even suggests they track down another human when hearing about two other Generals being in the Digital World, thinking that they might know how to get home. When hearing about the Code Crown and the dreams of being Digimon King, she goes with it, thinking that if Shoutmon becomes King, they will be able to go home. After Shoutmon defeats Tactimon, Mikey returns to the Digital World, while Angie stays in the human world. After forming the Fusion Fighters United Army and retreating to a separate subspace, they reunite with Cutemon. After MegaDarknessBagramon's defeat, Angie moved to another town, but is still in touch with Mikey. Mikey tried to hide the existence of the DigiQuartz from her and Jeremy in order to protect them, but she eventually learned the truth when Mikey was targeted by SuperStarmon. Angie assists Mikey during a baseball game, while wearing his goggles after he fell into exhaustion over his team's victory. While fighting Quartzmon, Angie receives an orange Fusion Loader, and owns Cutemon and Dorulumon as partners for the Fusion Fighters United Army.

Dorulumon

 is a strong wolf-like Digimon with drills on his body who is also Cutemon's guardian. He once served with the Bagra Army as Tactimon's right-hand man, until leaving the organization due to its cruel methods, which involved sacrificing some of his own troops when doing an attack on a neighboring territory to the Magma Zone, though Dorulumon managed to warn BlueMeramon, as well as some eavesdropping Boltmon. Though he rejected repeated offers from Mikey to join the Fusion Fighters, preferring to travel alone, while aiding Cutemon in finding his parents, Dorulumon became a Fusion Fighter to honor his fallen friend BlueMeramon. He forms the lower body and right shoulder of Shoutmon X3 and subsequent forms. He can also DigiFuse with Shoutmon to become  for Shoutmon or OmniShoutmon's use or DigiFuse with Starmon and several silver Pickmon to give his tail propeller-like properties, allowing him to fly. During the final battle against Quartzmon, Angie receives a Fusion Loader and Dorulumon becomes one of her partners.
 : Dorulumon's Digivolved form after partnering up with Angie. It only appears in the manga.

Cutemon

 is a mischievous and peppy but timid pink rabbit-like Fairy Digimon, whose ears are actually a means for him to sense nearby Digimon to hide from, and tends to say "Kyu" at the end of his sentences in the Japanese version. Being the only one of his village to have escaped from the Bagra Army, Cutemon was found by Dorulumon as the two search for his abducted parents. Cutemon encountered Angie while in the Village of Light, taking a liking to her and her friends before eventually joining the team as their healer. In the process, Cutemon manages to find his parents but remains with the Fusion Fighters. During the threat of Quartzmon, Angie received a Fusion Loader and Mikey gave her Cutemon.

 : A DigiFusion of Cutemon with Dondokomon, Jijimon, ChibiTortomon, Beastmon, Knightmon and PawnChessmon.

An exceedingly sensible person, he insists on troublesome things like how etiquette in a duel should be properly implemented. Because of this, Mikey feels awkward around his presence and Angie very obviously tries to chase him away. On the other hand, he grows familiar with the enemy's mentality and becomes a supporter for Mikey and the other Fusion Fighters. His parents run a mechanic-type business. Thanks to this, he is knowledgeable about machines and does repairs to Ballistamon. He also has a severe crush on Nene Amano, which sometimes leads him to make a fool of himself. After returning to the human world, Mikey leaves Jeremy behind. Later, Jeremy aids Mikey. After MegaDarknessBagramon's defeat, Jeremy moved to another town. Mikey tried to hide the existence of DigiQuartz from him and Angie in order to protect them, but Mikey tells Jeremy after being attacked by SuperStarmon. Upon learning about the Digimon hunt, Jeremy bursts into Mikey's room, asking Mikey where he can find the Old Clock Shop Man so he can get a Fusion Loader and join the hunt. In the fight against Quartzmon, Jeremy receives a cerulean Fusion Loader, and owns Ballistamon and Deputymon as partners.

Ballistamon

 is Shoutmon's best friend and a noble, taciturn warrior, who resembles a robotic rhinoceros beetle. He was originally , a robotic stag beetle equipped with powerful gatling cannons and a large loudspeaker, called the Doomsday Woofer, on his chest, who was created by the Dark General Olegmon, as a superweapon, until a test of his sonic powers went awry and sent him into the Forest Zone. The force of the impact caused DarkVolumon to shut down, as he was found by Shoutmon, who repaired and reconfigured him. With most of his memories lost, DarkVolumon was rechristened "Ballistamon" by Shoutmon and became his friend. Though Olegmon later restores his minion's memory, Shoutmon snaps Ballistamon to his senses. As a member of the Fusion Fighters, Ballistamon forms the main body of Shoutmon X2 and the left shoulder, lower torso, and arms of Shoutmon X3 and subsequent forms. Before the final battle against Quartzmon, Jeremy received a Fusion Loader and Ballistamon officially became his partner along with Deputymon.
 : DigiFuse of Ballistamon and Beastmon.
 : Ballistamon's Digivolved form after he partners up with Jeremy. It only appears in the manga.

Christopher Aonuma

Before coming to the Digital World, he is the son of the CEO of the Aonuma Group and head of the Aonuma Clan, who is mistreated to mold him into a successor by sending him to an elite school. The time Christopher was twelve after his strict parents died in an accident, Christopher's estate was taken away by the authorities and it caused his personality to turn ruthless. By the time Bagramon learned of this when he sensed his negative emotions and the desire to become as strong as his father reached its peak, he gave him his blue Fusion Loader in secret, thus letting Christopher selling his soul to him. Soon after, Christopher formed Team Blue Flare, a group that reflects his ambition to be strong and undisputed. Christopher originally had an interest in Mikey because of his strength and abilities, helping him at times to persuade Mikey to join his army before considering him a worthy rival. Christopher decided to join forces with Nene Amano before ending their partnership in the Jungle Zone, when she tries to force him to torture a defeated Stingmon for information, seeing such an action beneath him. He soon ended being controlled by AxeKnightmon's Darkness Loader to serve him as the new general of Midnight before Mikey snaps him out of it. Since then, now seeing Mikey as a worthy rival to him, Christopher aided the Fusion Fighters prior to losing his Code Crown fragments to Bagramon, with his group the only active resistance against the Bagra Army by the time Mikey and Shoutmon return from Earth. After helping the Fusion Fighters destroy NeoMyotismon, Christopher allies himself with Mikey and Nene to deal with the remaining Dark Generals, with Blue Flare integrated into the Fusion Fighters United Army. In Canyon Land, Christopher came up with a very dangerous plan to attack Gravimon. However, playing on Christopher's emotions and revealing Bagramon's role in him gaining a Fusion Loader, Gravimon temporarily brainwashes Christopher to attack Mikey and the others to prove his strength. However, when Deckerdramon sacrifices himself to protect everyone, Christopher received closure when his strict parents told him that he was proud of him and that he was not alone anymore, enabling Shoutmon X7 to be born. After the final defeat of the Dark Generals and the death of Axeknightmon, Christopher helped fight in the final battle against Bagramon. After MegaDarknessBagramon's defeat, regaining some of his parents' fortune, Christopher moved to America to atone for his sins and pay for what he has done due to his deeds with the devil. Learning of the Digimon Hunt, Christopher was skeptical of its true purpose and resolved to investigate it around the world. Despite his suspicions, he appears during the Digimon Hunter gathering alongside his Blue Flare Army, using ZekeGreymon to capture Volcdramon. He tells Mikey and the others that, although he will continue investigating the Digimon Hunt and DigiQuartz, he will act separately and tells Mikey to look after Japan until they meet again. Christopher and Nene return to Japan to defeat Quartzmon.

Greymon
 
 is Christopher's main partner and primary Digimon in Team Blue Flare. Like his human partner, Greymon valued strength above everything else and had no respect for Shoutmon as he tends to insult his size. Prior to being formerly introduced to the Fusion Fighters at the Lake Zone, Greymon appeared when Christopher needed to execute hit and run attacks on the Bagra Army. During the collapse of the Disc Zone, Greymon, MailBirdramon and Shoutmon are trapped in the rubble. Even though Greymon and MailBirdramon initially gave up hope, seeing Shoutmon's determination both earned Greymon's respect and gave him the will to survive.

 
 The flight-capable DigiFusion of Greymon and MailBirdramon, armed with cannons and a three-pronged claw. His signature move is Giga Blaster.

  ZekeGreymon is the natural digivolved form of MetalGreymon, having been made possible through Christopher's pride after taking Dracomon's words to heart. ZekeGreymon is clad in golden armor and his final attack is Final Trident Strike. He can Double Fusion with OmniShoutmon to become Shoutmon DX or Great Fusion with OmniShoutmon, Ballistamon, Dorulumon, Sparrowmon and the Starmons to become Shoutmon X7.

 
 
 The tank-like DigiFusion of MetalGreymon and Deckerdramon, armed with many powerful cannons and treads for transport.

Blue Flare Digimon
 
 
 A metal bird-like Digimon who serves as Christopher's primary vehicle of transportation. He forms the armor of MetalGreymon.

 
 
 A fearsome cyborg dragonoid with a lance as his weapon. This version of Cyberdramon is much different from the original one. When DigiFused with Dracomon, Cyberdramon provides the armor of their combined form CyberDracomon.

 
 
 The Jungle Zone's former guardian. An armored, metallic, crocodile Digimon armed with powerful weaponry, including his Crocodile Cannons. He was sought out by SkullKnightmon for the purpose of allying but chose to join Christopher and Blue Flare instead. He forms the tank treads and arm-mounted cannon of DeckerGreymon. Deckerdramon can also transform into  for water transportation. While in Canyon Land, Deckerdramon was ultimately murdered by Gravimon, giving the Fusion Fighters United Army the power to Great Fusion into Shoutmon X7. He is eventually revived in the final battle with DarknessBagramon.

 
 
 A small dragon Digimon encountered by Mikey and Shoutmon in Dragonland after deserting the Bagra Army, as his ideal meaning of strength differs from Dorbickmon's. After meeting with and talking to Christopher, having idolized the human and played in a role in him able to digivolve MetalGreymon to ZekeGreymon, Dracomon decided to join him upon leaving Dragonland. As he was a Bagra Army member after Bagramon reformatted the Digital World, Dracomon knows how to make plans to help the Fusion Fighters United Army stop the Dark Generals. When DigiFused with Cyberdramon, Dracomon grows in size and gains strong armor becoming CyberDracomon.

 
 A bunch of Golemon make up the foot soldiers of Blue Flare. Christopher DigiFused a Golemon with Mailbirdramon to give Mailbirdramon a rocky hammer-like tail. An army of Golemon fought against Dorbickmon's army. When it came to the fight with DarknessBagramon, Ewan Amano DigiFused one of Christopher's Golemon with Mikey's Jijimon and ChibiTortomon to form Golem Jiji Tortomon.

 
 A bunch of Gaossmon make up Blue Flare's foot soldiers. When it came to the fight against DarknessBagramon, Ewan Amano DigiFused some of Christopher's Gaossmon with some of Mikey's PawnChessmon in order to form PawnGaossmon.

 
 A volcanic dragon Digimon in the center of a special Digimon Hunter gathering, organized by the Clock Store Owner on a distant island. Explaining that Volcdramon fully emerged along with a few other isolated Digimon, the Clock Store Owner states that Volcdramon has the potential to cause catastrophic damage in the human world, if left to his devices. While Volcdramon easily overpowered the hunters, Christopher and ZekeGreymon managed to find and attack his weak spot, capturing him.

Nene Amano

 is a brown-haired girl and a figurehead leader of Team Midnight after receiving the black Fusion Loader from SkullKnightmon after he promised to reunite with her brother Ewan in his agenda. On SkullKnightmon's orders, Nene continuously spies and assists, Mikey and Christopher, forming an alliance with the latter in the Lake Zone. She later reveals her relationship to SkullKnightmon while in the Jungle Zone before later being trapped in a tower, once she is no longer needed. Following the team up between Blue Flare and the Fusion Fighters against the forces of Laylamon and Axeknightmon in the Dust Zone, Nene joins the Fusion Fighters after they end up in the Warrior Zone. Though her Fusion Loader was damaged, it regained its function once she accepted her role as a member of the team, as it changes color from black to lavender. Though she travels separately from them, using the Monitamon to stay in touch, Nene uses her intelligence gathering to help the Fusion Fighters, while looking for her brother. After Mikey, Jeremy, Angie and Shoutmon are sent to Earth by Bagramon, Nene began to make a habit to don disguises to move incognito in the reformatted Digital World, even after being reunited with Mikey. While in Honey Land, gaining Mervamon as an ally, Nene finally finds her brother Ewan, as well as learns that he is deceived by SkullKnightmonDigimon Xros Wars episode 49
into believing that the Digital World and its inhabitants are all part of a virtual game where killing Digimon and humans alike will bear no consequences. Upon learning of this, Nene vowed to make Ewan realize the truth and bring him back home. After MegaDarknessBagramon's defeat, Nene travels to Hong Kong to become an idol. When Quartzmon invades Earth, Nene returns to Japan and helps Tagiru defeat him.

Sparrowmon

 is a mechanical yellow sparrow Digimon with a trigger-happy personality who is Nene's main partner. After the battle in the Sky Zone, Mikey gave Sparrowmon a Squawker as a symbol of their friendship and later she officially joined the Fusion Fighters beside Nene after the battle in the Dust Zone. She can perform a DigiFuse with Shoutmon X4 into Shoutmon X5 or DigiFuse with Shoutmon to form  to give Shoutmon a flying platform.
 Sparrowmon's digivolved form. It only appears in the manga.

Mervamon

 is a Warrior Digimon, armed with the "Olympia Kai" blade and the snake-headed "Medullia" shield, who has the habit of rushing into battle without a plan of attack. She resides in Honey Land as a rebel fighter, defending the land from its Dark General, Zamielmon, and his forces, whereas her brother Ignitemon was among his minions. After she meets the Fusion Fighters United Army in Honey Land, she decides to align with Nene, even after Ignitemon defected from Zamielmon. While in the Underworld, she develops feelings for Beelzemon, upset when he sacrificed himself and later overjoyed when he is revived.

Nene's other Digimon
 
 
 A bunch of green, ninja-like Digimon, with monitors for heads, originally from the Warrior Zone, helping Nene as her spies. Despite their bumbling and comedic behavior, they are considered elites among Monitamon. Three red Monitamon encountered the Fusion Fighters in the Warrior Zone, joining Mikey to serve as a link to Monitamon. The three red ones can DigiFuse to form , a black-colored version with stronger attacks and a miniature transmission tower on its head. Despite being carried in Mikey's Fusion Loader, the three red Monitamons are always DigiFused by Nene. In the final battle against Bagramon, the green Monitamon were DigiFused to form a second and additional Hi-Vision Monitamon.

 
 A small green television-shaped Digimon with a leaf-like antenna who is carried by Nene. It has the power to teleport itself and others short distances as seen during the final fight with Bagramon.

Ewan Amano

He had met his future partner Damemon for the first time on the day his grandmother died. Having been against playing with others in fear of hurting them, he was deceived by SkullKnightmon, under the notion that the Digital World is just a virtual game and destroying Digimon and humans alike have no real consequences. As a result, under the delusion that it is a game with no consequences, Ewan fettered out his hostility and became a sadist, who fights with no holds barred, even against his own sister. During the events in the Underworld battleground under Bright Land, Mikey manages to convince Ewan that SkullKnightmonDigimon Xros Wars episode 47 is using him and tricked him into hurting others. However, SkullKnightmon abducts Ewan and imprisons him before he is saved by Mervamon. Ewan later aligned with Mikey and the rest of the Fusion Fighters United Army in the final battle against DarknessBagramon and his Darkness Loader changed into a yellow Fusion Loader. One year later, Ewan, now in the seventh grade, joins Mikey's basketball team with Tagiru. He looks up to Mikey as his senior and views Tagiru as brash and idiotic. He was secretly envious of Tagiru and the others for having Digimon partners with Damemon nowhere to be found, rendering Ewan virtually useless in battle. In a fight against Airu, Damemon and Ewan were finally reunited, with Damemon officially becoming Ewan's partner. Ewan lives on his own, because his parents are traveling and Nene is in Hong Kong. Despite being in seventh grade, Ewan is very responsible on his own.

Damemon

Damemon 

 is a robotic Sukamon-based Digimon who was originally a member of Team Midnight, recruited alongside Ewan. Accompanied by Tyutyumon, he served as SkullKnightmon's third-in-command and spy within the Bagra Army by playing the role of Lalyamon's pet to occasionally sit in on meetings with Bagramon and the Three Generals, criticizing them constantly. After the Bagra Army succeeded in conquering the Digital World, Damemon is reassigned to be Ewan's personal bodyguard, but starts to care for Ewan's safety to the point of considering the idea that he must tell the boy the truth behind SkullKnightmon's lie. After Whispered's destruction, Damemon succumbs to the wounds he received from Shoutmon X7 and dies in Ewan's arms. Unlike other previously destroyed Digimon, Damemon was not found among those resurrected during the final battle against DarknessBagramon, as his spirit was waiting for Ewan to be strong on his own first before he was revived and becoming his Digimon partner. Damemon often insults people he does not respect, a habit he carries on, even after his resurrection, especially for Tagiru and Gumdramon. He also carries on his habit of criticizing things with his catchphrase "No Good", but to a lesser degree.

 is Damemon's fighting form, a powerful ninja-like Digimon possessing formidable battle power, equipped with the sickle-like . After his reconfiguration, Damemon can now only become Tuwarmon through digivolution with Ewan's help. While a member of Team Midnight, he placed at least one special subordinate in each of the seven lands for Ewan to use. Tuwarmon could DigiFuse with AxeKnightmon to form the cannon of MusoKnightmon. Tuwarmon can also DigiFuse with Axemon to become  and upgrade himself by combining with Sethmon Wild Mode, Gorillamon, Oryxmon and Bullmon to become .

Ewan's other Digimon
 
 
 A Mutant Digimon and the strongest among the Starmon type Digimon, sometimes using English words in his speech. Just as Mikey's Starmon has Pickmon, SuperStarmon has his own Star Army, the members of which could combine into different shapes, which resemble the Starmon on Mikey's side. SuperStarmon was collecting people to add to his collection of celebrity dolls before being defeated by the combined efforts of Arresterdramon, Astamon, Shoutmon X4 and Tuwarmon, and captured by Ewan.

 
 A Puppet Digimon that digivolved from a KnightChessmon that appeared on Earth by manipulating several kids in a card game. He was eventually defeated by the combined efforts of Gumdramon, Damemon and Shoutmon, and captured by Ewan.

Tagiru Akashi

 is Ewan's classmate. He owns a crimson Fusion Loader, received by the Old Clock Store Owner. His Digimon partner is Gumdramon. Tagiru is a teammate in Mikey and Ewan's Xros Heart basketball team. He is energetic and reckless and always does things without thinking, but despite his rash behavior, he risks anything to protect his friends. He holds Mikey on high regards and is determined to become as strong and reliable as him. He is hinted to have a crush on Nene. After defeating Quartzmon, he became the strongest Hunter and the seventh Legendary Hero in the Digimon Multiverse.

Gumdramon

 is a tiny purple dragon Digimon and Tagiru's partner. While having to use him merely to obtain the power provided by a human partner, they become friends. He calls himself the Digital World's "number one wild child". Tagiru and Gumdramon are very similar as both are overly enthusiastic and reckless: just like Tagiru aims to one day surpass Mikey, Gumdramon aims to become stronger than Shoutmon.
  Gumdramon's digivolved form, a large dragon Digimon armed with powerful yellow gauntlets. Arresterdramon can fire dragon-like projectiles from his Tail Anchor while performing his Prism Gallet technique. In spite of his power, his recklessness and lack of experience gives him a hard time comparing to his comrades OmniShoutmon and Tuwarmon.
  Arresterdramon's digivolved form. He releases all powers from sealing away.

Tagiru's collection
 
 
 A cyborg Tyrannosaurus Digimon hunted by Ryouma, after Gumdramon lured him into the domain. MetalTyrannomon is defeated by Arresterdramon and captured by Tagiru. When DigiFused onto Arresterdramon, MetalTyrannomon provides him with sturdy armor.

 
 
 A Kappa-like Digimon who kidnapped several insecure students from Tagiru's school, using their negative emotions to power himself in battle. He was weakened by the DigiFuse of OmniShoutmon and Dorulumon and defeated by the DigiFuse of Arresterdramon and MetalTyrannomon. Sagomon was then captured by Tagiru. When DigiFused onto Arresterdramon, Sagomon provides him with water attributes and increase his cutting abilities with use of his staff.

 
 
 A massive mechanical dragon Digimon modeled after Breakdramon that was created by the robotics club at Tagiru's school with the assistance of Puppetmon. He was weakened by the DigiFuse of Shoutmon and Puppetmon and defeated by Arresterdramon, then captured by Tagiru. When DigiFused onto Arresterdramon, GigaBreakdramon provides him with his shovels.

 
 
 A rare pink Blossomon offers to aid Miho Suto by getting rid of the top ten students in her class while creating a symbiotic link between them. Eventually, once exposed, Blossomon Biomerges Miho into her body. After Miho is removed from the Digimon with her hold over the girl broken, Tagiru captures Blossomon. When DigiFused onto Arresterdramon, Blossomon provides him with both chest armor and her tendrils to grab or restraint the opponent.

 Kotemon
 A kendo-themed Digimon whom Tagiru DigiFused onto with Gumdramon for kendo skills.

 
 A deceptive In-Training Digimon with a love for human food.

 
 
 A Harpy-type Digimon appeared before Nene's father amid his anxiety over her decision of becoming an idol in Hong Kong claiming to help him protect her but feeding off his negative emotions instead.

 
 
 A Majin Digimon with mastery over fire-based magic, FlameWizarmon took the desires and energy from various humans including Tagiru. After Tagiru freed himself from the spell, he captures FlameWizarmon.

 
 
 A green ogre Digimon who loves to make ramen with Fugamon, yet is unable to create a delicious soup to keep their ramen business afloat. As a result, the two make a deal with Mr. Katsuji to supply him with their noodles if he gives them his soup for their use.

 
 
 A red ogre Digimon who loves to make ramen with Ogremon, yet is unable to create a delicious soup to keep their ramen business afloat. As a result, the two make a deal with Mr. Katsuji to supply him with their noodles if he gives them his soup for their use.

 
 
 A demon Digimon who appear in the Human World by brainwashing several students in Taigiru's class.

 
 
 A cosplay-type puppet Digimon who is usually wearing a Gatomon suit, Betsumon is Gumdramon's former comrade. In the past, he and Gumdramon were bandits that steal from other Digimon who are criminals. However, he ran away when Gumdramon got caught. Some of Betsumon's Digimon disguises include Angemon, Astamon, AxeKnightmon, Examon, Monitamon, Omnimon, Pandamon, Beastmon, Shoutmon, and Stingmon. He lost his memories of Gumdramon the same way Puppetmon did, but it was restored when Tagiru captured him.

 Ekakimon
 
 A pencil-like Digimon with the power to bring drawings to life, bonding with a lonely art student and bringing his drawings of various cryptids to life (ranging from an army of Sasquatch, a three-eyed Plesiosaurus, a Dragon, and a Cyclops). However, when the student's drawing of "The Ultimate UMA" (which had the heads of a Cyclops, a Dragon, and a three-eyed Plesiosaurus, the wings of a Dragon, and the body of a Sasquatch) started to attack them, Ekakimon realized the error of his ways and helped Tagiru and Arresterdramon stop his greatest creation before voluntarily joining them.

 
 
 A Cthulhu-based Digimon who was after Plesiomon.

 
 
 A Sakkakumon collaborated with Jokermon to swallow the happiness of the children that visit Digimon Land.

 
 
 A Jokermon worked with Sakkakumon in a plot to swallow the happiness of the children that visit Digimon Land.

Bagra Army
The  is an evil legion of Digimon, who serve as primary antagonists for the first series.

Bagramon

, referred to as just "Lord Bagra'''" in the Fusion'' dub, is a Demon Lord Digimon who replaced half of his body with one made of a ghastly wood and a magical ruby eye that allows him to see everything in the Digital World. Bagramon attempts to keep all Code Crown fragments, in order to change the Digital World in his image. However, he is defeated by Shoutmon. At the end of the series, it is revealed that the Clock Store Owner is Bagramon's reincarnation.

Clockmon

 is Bagramon's only Digimon companion while posing as his human self's Digimon partner. Resembling a traditional alarm clock, Clockmon bring the heroes of the previous seasons, in order to aid the Fusion Fighters United Army and Digimon Hunters.

AxeKnightmon
AxeKnightmon 
Skullknightmon 
Axemon 

 is a large, powerful black knight Digimon armed with the dual-bladed Twin Lance, the younger brother of Bagramon.

Three Generals
The  are three mighty Digimon that work under Bagramon and are in charge of the Zone Battalion Commanders.

Tactimon

 is a samurai Digimon who keeps 26 Code Crown fragments. His personal weapon, cannot be removed from the sheath, which Bagramon sealed. He was destroyed by OmniShoutmon.

Laylamon

 is a Demon Lady Digimon and the most skilled manipulator of the Three Generals, possessing 24 Code Crown fragments. She has proved to be merciless and cunning, often using her servants to do the attacking while she stands on the sidelines. She was ultimately destroyed in the Underworld by Shoutmon X7 and Beelzemon.

Blastmon

 is a Mineral Digimon and the toughest of the Three Generals, often accompanied by a trio of Vilemon. While armed with a club-tipped tail and powerful punching and kicking attacks, Blastmon can create clones of himself out of his fragments and transfer his consciousness over to them. His body was destroyed by Shoutmon X5B, but his head managed to survive. Later in the Underworld, he was destroyed by Shoutmon X7 and Beelzemon.

Dark Generals
The  are the seven most powerful Digimon in the Bagra Army and the Digital World, and are the rulers of the seven kingdoms surrounding the Bagra Fortress, serving under Bagramon and SkullKnightmon. The Dark Generals are assigned the task of collecting a large supply of negative emotion from the Digimon they terrorize to fuel the Code Crown in preparation for D5, a future day of destruction.

Dorbickmon the Fire-fury

He was destroyed by ZekeGreymon.

NeoMyotismon the Moonlight 

Using his army of Devimon and LadyDevimon to gather Lopmon in his domain, NeoMyotismon has been using his Darkness Loader to absorb them to make himself immortal. He was destroyed by Shoutmon DX.

Zamielmon the Wood-spirit

He has the title of Lord. He was destroyed by Shoutmon DX with JetMervamon's assistance.

Splashmon the Water Tiger 

Splashmon is a shapeshifter who used his abilities along with his familiars, called , to stir mistrust among the original occupants of Cyber Land before tricking them into destroying each other. He was destroyed by Shoutmon DX.

Olegmon the Gold Pirate 
Olegmon 
Surtr 
Jormungand 

Armed with his Dual Tomahawk battleaxes (Twin Broadswords in the English dub), Olegmon is a super-heavyweight Digimon whose body is clad in golden-steel armor with the treasure chests on his shoulders holding the happy shadow (bright demon in the original)  and the gloomy shadow (dark demon in the original) . He overpowered Shoutmon X4S, but was eventually destroyed by Ballistamon.

Gravimon the Earth Spirit

He is a strategist who manipulates gravity and tends to be a step ahead of his opponents, transplanting his DigiCore into an opponent to have the advantage to regenerate indefinitely as long as his core is unharmed. He was destroyed by Shoutmon X7 and Christoper.

Apollomon the Sun and Whispered
Apollomon 
Whispered 

 is a virus program created by Bagramon. Apollomon attempts to resist the ego. He was destroyed by Shoutmon X7.

GrandGeneramon
 is a Unique Digimon, whom is the combined forms of all seven Dark Generals. Called by AxeKnightmon to be the strongest and most evil of destructive gods, GrandGeneramon has the head and chest of Dorbickmon, the wings and left arm of NeoMyotismon, the abdomen and tail of Zamielmon, the body of Splashmon as its lower half, the right arm of Olegmon, the right arm of Gravimon with its chest and tentacles as the shoulder, and the crest and left arm of Apollomon.

Team Ryouma

Ryouma Mogami

 is a boy who owns a green Fusion Loader. He is the leader of his Digimon hunting team, consisting of Ren and Airu. He is aware of Mikey's actions in the Digital World, witnessing the battle between OmniShoutmon and Tactimon and later the final battle between the Fusion Fighters United Army and MegaDarknessBagramon. He spends his time watching Xros Heart to understand their method of fighting and is rather curious on Tagiru's ability on hunting. Despite his cold and powerful exterior, he seems to be an honorable hunter, as seen when he returned Gumdramon to Tagiru after the partners got into a dispute. He also assisted Xros Heart with fighting SuperStarmon and allowed his team to join forces with them to hunt Betsumon. Following the fight with SuperStarmon, Ryouma meets the Old Clock Store Owner in regards to how effective his strength really is. When Quartzmon makes his move on Earth and the legendary heroes arrive to help before the final battle can take place, Ryouma reveals his true intentions after obtaining the only weapon that can harm his benefactor by injuring Mikey and OmniShoutmon and betraying everyone. However, this was because Ryouma himself had been brainwashed by Astamon, who was actually Quartzmon's Terminal in disguise. He snaps out of his brainwashing and then appears to be truly regretful for what he has done. But as he soon collects himself, Ryouma encourages Tagiru to defeat Quartzmon.

Quartzmon

 appears as the primary antagonist in the second season. A Digimon created in DigiQuartz, both byproducts of D5. He corrupts every Digimon, causing the world imbalance of restricting one Digimon at a time from each Fusion Loaders. As Astamon, he uses Ryouma to oppose them, but he betrays him. When Quartzmon attempts to change the world, he is defeated by Arresterdramon and Quartzmon is sealed in the form of a Digi-Egg.

  An Ultimate Level Demon Man Digimon who is actually a clone of the original, since Astamon was the first Digimon that Quartzmon brought into DigiQuartz. Dressed in mafia attire, Astamon's weapon of choice is the Oro Salmón tommy gun.
  Astamon's rookie form, a purple reptile Digimon whose fur pelt makes him almost a dead ringer for Gabumon. Astamon usually appears as Psychemon when having no need to fight.

Ryouma's collection
The only known Digimon in his collection so far are

 
 
 A potato-like Digimon.

 
 A Triceratops-like Digimon.

 
 A Cerberus-like Digimon.

 
 
 MetallifeKuwagamon is a mysterious golden Digimon who Ryouma captured to be a sacrifice for Quartzmon. Though defeated by Tagiru, MetallifeKuwagamon is destroyed before revealing his kidnapper.

Ren Tobari

 is a cool-headed boy who owns a gray Fusion Loader, targeting rare Digimon. Even though he respects Mikey and Ewan, he has no respect for Tagiru. He disregards human safety if it means he can capture a Digimon and not caring if anyone gets hurt.

His Digimon collection consists of Bakemon, BigMamemon, Chamelemon, Datamon, Digitamamon, Dolphmon, Kimeramon, Kokatorimon, Mojyamon, Moosemon, Nanimon, Phantomon, Plesiomon, Pteramon, ShogunGekomon, Swanmon, and Vademon. Ren obtains a DemiDevimon, marking it his hundredth hunt.

Dracmon

 is Ren's partner, a mischievous vampire-themed Undead Digimon.
  Dracmon's digivolved form, a Warrior Digimon armed with two wooden swords. According to Ren, Dracmon is unable to digivolve without the emotional energy of a human. Though he managed to defeat Arresterdramon and Kotemon, he lost to the DigiFuse of Gumdramon and Kotemon due to lack of experience with his new form.

Airu Suzaki

 is a girl who owns a pink Fusion Loader. She exclusively hunts cute Digimon and is very persistent while doing so, unforgiving to anyone who gets in her way. After Ewan meddles in her affairs of hunting down Cutemon and turned down her offer to become her subordinate by bullying him, Airu develops an obsessive love-hate relationship with him. Later, she starts to mature a little.

Her Digimon collection consists of Candlemon and Parasimon, the latter of which she thinks is cute in a gross way.

Opossummon

 is an opossum-like Digimon who flies the sky with her virus-filled balloons. She seems to be possessive about Airu and showed jealousy when Airu called Cutemon cute and wanted to make him as her own Digimon.
 Opossumon's Digivolved form, a Puppet Digimon resembling a girl in a pig-themed costume. She wields the  whose lethality is augmented by her superhuman strength. Despite her power, Cho-Hakkaimon is still unable to defeat more experienced Digimon like Tuwarmon.

Allies
Various Digimon who aided the Fusion Fighters throughout their travels.

 
 
 A large turtle-shaped Digimon who is the elder of an island in the Island Zone, and an old friend of Jijimon.

 
 
 A clam-type Digimon who is one of the inhabitants of the Island Zone.

 
 
 A seal-type Digimon who is one of the inhabitants of the Island Zone.

 
 
 A gigantic whale Digimon whose face and back comprises the entire Island Zone, placing the Island Zone's Code Crown fragment within himself.

 
 
 Pharaohmon is the ruler of the Sand Zone. He is an Egyptian-themed Digimon and curses any intruder who enters his tomb.

 
 
 A human-sized Dogū-like Digimon who is the Commissioner of Elections in the Sky Zone, Shakkoumon initially presented himself a shady enigma to the Fusion Fighters when he first saves Mikey's life and warns him and his friends of unseen dangers before later seen observing various events from a distance.

 
 
 SlushAngemon is a bladed-armed angel Digimon who is the chief of the Sky Zone's Angel Police and the Sky Zone's former President.

 
 
 A trenchcoat-wearing Gargoylemon is the inspector that works for the Sky Zone's Angel Police, prone to jumping to conclusions.

 
 
 A green insectoid Digimon who lives in the Jungle Zone and is the sworn guardian of Deckerdramon, becoming the Zone's protector after Deckerdramon joins Blue Flare.

 
 
 A flowed-based fairy Digimon who lives in the Jungle Zone. She aids Stingmon out of love and proclaims herself as the Battle Cry Forest's Warrior of Love.

 
 
 A waste-based resident who leads a gang of MetalMamemon, ShadowToyAgumon, and a Trailmon Kettle.
 
 
 A Monitamon that is the leader of the Monitamon in the Warrior Zone.

 
 
 A Karatenmon resides in the mountains of the Warrior Zone. The Fusion Fighters and Musyamon's Etemon had to work to get Karatenmon to laugh in order to get the Warrior Zone's Code Crown fragment.

 
 
 A tiny fairy Digimon in Disc Zone. During the party, Shoutmon gives his DigiBytes to Lunamon as a gift, and after she eats it, she decides to keep the container as a reminder of Shoutmon's kindness.

 
 
 An armored Digimon living in Sweets Zone. He seeks out the Fusion Fighters' help in freeing all residents.

 
 
 A fire lion Digimon who resides in the Sweets Zone. He was among the prisoners of Matadormon until they were freed by the Monitamon.

 Cutemon's Mom and Dad
  
  
 Cutemon's parents, who were captured by the Bagra Army, but Cutemon frees them.

 
 
 A resident of Honey Land, Mervamon's brother and Zamielmon's soldier.

Others

Mami Takahashi

One of Tagiru's and Ewan's classmates. As noted by Mikey and Tagiru, Mami refers to Ewan as "Yuu-sama".

Hideaki Mashimo

A Digimon Hunter and Tagiru's friend. Unlike other ones, he has no interest in hunting Digimon and rather focuses in saving money for his upcoming takoyaki store. He also owns the purple Fusion Loader and Dobermon as his partner.

Kiichi Funabashi

A boy who likes trains and railroads. He began to run a night train trip around the world with his partner Locomon. He has a turquoise Fusion Loader.

Mizuki

A deepsea treasure hunter and one of Mikey's friends. She owns a royal blue Royal Loader, received by the Clock Store Owner. She also owns Submarimon as her partner.

References

External links
 English character list
 Toei Animation character list
 TV Asahi character list

Xros Wars characters